The MirOS Licence is a free content licence (for software and other free cultural works such as graphical, literal, musical, …) originated at The MirOS Project for their own publications because the ISC license used by OpenBSD was perceived as having problems with wording and too America centric. It has strong roots in the UCB BSD licence and the Historical Permission Notice and Disclaimer with a focus on modern, explicit, legible language and usability by European (except UK), specifically German, authors (while not hindering adoption by authors from other legislations). It is a permissive ("BSD/MIT-style") licence.

Another novelty is that this licence was specified for any kind of copyrightable work from the start; as such, it not only meets the Open Source Definition and Debian Free Software Guidelines but also the Open Knowledge Definition and, in fact, has been approved by the OKFN long before OSI did.

The licence has not seen formal legal review, but is listed on ifrOSS' licence centre webpages. The Free Software Foundation has not formally added the licence as either a free software licence or Free Documentation License to their pages, but their software directory has a category for it.

The license was accepted as a free content license according to the Free Cultural Works definition.

References

External links
 HTML version of the licence text
 UTF-8 plain text version
 CVSweb of the master copy of the licence text (note: license.template was the ISC license used by OpenBSD, licence.template is the one written by Thorsten Glaser and developed for MirOS)
 ifrOSS licence centre (English) listing
 Open Definition (OKFN) listing
 OSI (Open Source Initiative) listing
 Freedom Defined listing
 Fedora Project listing

Berkeley Software Distribution
Free and open-source software licenses
Free content licenses